Małgorzata Tlałka (born 27 April 1963) is a Polish-French former alpine skier.

From 1986 to 1991 she competed for France under the name of Malgorzata Tlalka-Mogore or Malgorzata Mogore-Tlalka.

Career
She competed in the 1984 Winter Olympics and 1988 Winter Olympics.She is the twin sister of fellow alpine skier Dorota Tlałka-Mogore.

The twins were born into a winter sports family: their father, Jan, was a 16-time Polish speed skating champion, whilst their mother Wlada was a cross-country skier. They both skied and skated during their childhood before they focused on skiing from the age of 12. In 1985 the twins decided to leave Poland as they were unhappy with the training opportunities in the country. They originally intended to study and train in France and continue to compete for Poland, however in October 1985 Dorota and Małgorzata married French brothers Christian and Christophe Mogore (the former a sports journalist, the latter a former racing cyclist) and the pair became French citizens in June 1986. Małgorzata finished seventh in the giant slalom at the 1987 Alpine Skiing World Championships.

Personal life
After the marriage of her twin sister Dorota to French Christian Mogore, Malgorzata also contracted a marriage of convenience with Christian's younger brother to be able to stand next to her sister and compete for France.

After the end of her skiing career, Malgorzata ended her fictitious marriage by divorcing her and today she lives in Poland her Zakopane with her husband Piotr Dlugosz, a Polish engineer. The couple had three children (Piotr, Dorota and Jan).

References

External links
 
 

1963 births
Living people
Polish female alpine skiers
French female alpine skiers
Olympic alpine skiers of Poland
Olympic alpine skiers of France
Alpine skiers at the 1984 Winter Olympics
Alpine skiers at the 1988 Winter Olympics
Sportspeople from Zakopane
Polish emigrants to France
Naturalized citizens of France
Universiade medalists in alpine skiing
Universiade bronze medalists for Poland
Competitors at the 1983 Winter Universiade
Competitors at the 1985 Winter Universiade
Competitors at the 1991 Winter Universiade